Jeremy Garay (born April 1, 2003) is a professional footballer who currently plays as a midfielder for MLS side D.C. United. Born in the United States, he represents the El Salvador national team.

Career 
Garay recorded five games and one assist in his 2019 season. On January 7, 2020, it was announced that Garay would return for Loudoun in 2020.

On July 2, 2021, Garay signed with D.C. United as a homegrown player.

International career 
Garay holds dual citizenship in the United States and El Salvador. In August 2021, he was called up by the El Salvador national team for his first international appearance, a friendly match against Costa Rica.

On November 5, 2021, Garay received his first call-up to the United States men's national under-20 soccer team by coach Mikey Varas for the November 7–17 camp and Revelations Cup competition in Mexico. Garay played one match, starting and played 87 minutes against Mexico.

Career statistics

Club

Notes

References

2003 births
Living people
Soccer players from Virginia
Salvadoran footballers
El Salvador international footballers
American soccer players
American sportspeople of Salvadoran descent
Association football midfielders
Loudoun United FC players
D.C. United players
USL Championship players
Homegrown Players (MLS)
United States men's under-20 international soccer players
El Salvador under-20 international footballers